Unsub Records (originally titled Metamorphosis Music) is an American record label owned by Capitol Music Group and founded in 2014 by singer Katy Perry.

History
Perry first announced plans to launch her own label in June 2012. She spoke to The Hollywood Reporter about how the label will be managed: "When this record label does come to fruition, I'm going to try and avoid the things that take away any fighting chance for an artist to have financial success. As people are coming to me with opportunities, I'm thinking, 'How would I want to be treated?'" On June 17, 2014, Perry announced via Twitter that she had launched Metamorphosis Music as a subsidiary of Capitol Records, along with signing the singer-songwriter Ferras. The label's logo was revealed later that day.

In 2016, the label's name was changed to Unsub Records.

In July 2017, Perry signed Cyn, who was introduced to Perry through DJ Skeet Skeet after Cyn met him at one of the dates of Perry's California Dreams Tour.

In May 2021, Perry signed Michael J. Woodard, a former contestant from season 16 of American Idol.

Signed artists

Current
 Ferras
 Cyn
Michael J. Woodard

Releases

References 

2014 establishments in California
American record labels
Katy Perry
Capitol Records
Vanity record labels